Robert O'Billovich, nicknamed "Bobby O" or "Obie", (born June 30, 1940) is an east regional scout for the BC Lions of the Canadian Football League (CFL). O'Billovich has been involved with the CFL since 1963 in the roles of player, coach, general manager, scout, and several front-office positions. As a long-time coach in the CFL, he won 107 regular season games in the CFL, the eighth highest win total by a head coach in the league's history.

Early life
O'Billovich was born and raised in Butte, Montana, where he was an outstanding football and basketball player at Butte High School. At Butte HS he lettered three years in basketball and two years in football; making All State in both sports. He also lettered in track and played shortstop on the Butte American Legion baseball team.

NCAA college basketball
After graduating from high school in Butte, Montana, O'Billovich went to Missoula, Montana to attend Montana State University (later renamed the University of Montana). He played in the NCAA in football, basketball and baseball, where he started in all three sports for three years. O'Billovich started three years in football for Montana as a quarterback and defensive back (1959–1961). In addition, O'Billovich was a starting guard in basketball (1960–1962) and the starting shortstop in baseball for Montana (1960–1962). He was an all-Skyline Conference selection in all three sports. He also lettered at least one year in track for Montana. He was named University of Montana Athlete of the Decade for 1960–1970, and inducted to the University of Montana's Grizzly Athletic Hall of Fame in 1993.

Professional career
O'Billovich began his CFL career with the Ottawa Rough Riders in 1963 as a defensive back and backup quarterback. He also served as a backup placekicker, completed his only one-point convert attempt. He recorded 24 interceptions over 69 games with the Rough Riders between 1963 and 1967 before ending his playing career.

Basketball coaching career
Bob O'Billovich was coach of the Carleton University Ravens CIAU men's basketball team from 1971 to 1973. From 1973 to 1974, O'Billovich served as head coach for the University of Ottawa Gee-Gees men's basketball team.

Football administrative career
In 1974, O'Billovich launched his CFL coaching career with the Rough Riders, first as a guest coach, and then assistant coach.

O'Billovich was named head coach of the Toronto Argonauts in 1982, a position he held until 1989.  During his tenure at Toronto, the Argonauts appeared in the Grey Cup three times (1982, 1983, 1987), winning the Cup in 1983.  He was honoured as CFL Coach of the Year in 1982 and 1987.

Bob O'Billovich joined the BC Lions in midseason on September 14, 1990, as general manager and interim coach. The Lions had been off to a dismal 2–8-1 start that season; they finished the season with an improved 6–11-1 record. O'Billovich remained as head coach of the Lions through the end of the 1992 season, a year in which the Lions finished at 3–15.

In 1993, O'Billovich returned to the Argonauts as general manager. The Argos began that season poorly, and O'Billovich took over as head coach on September 10, 1993.  He coached for the remainder of the 1993 season and for the entirety of the 1994 season.  At the end of the 1994 season, O'Billovich relinquished the head coach position to concentrate on his general manager duties.  The Argos again had a poor start for the 1995 season and O'Billovich took over as head coach for the final nine games after firing Mike Faragalli; the team finished the season with a lackluster 4–14 record. He finished with 89 career regular season wins as a head coach of the Argonauts, which is the most in franchise history.

O'Billovich was director of player personnel with the Lions from 2003 to 2007.  In December 2007, O'Billovich was hired as general manager by the Hamilton Tiger-Cats. On January 12, 2012, the Hamilton Tiger-Cats announced his promotion to Vice President of football operations. On December 17, 2012, Kent Austin replaced O'Billovich as the Tiger-Cats' GM when he was also hired as the team's new head coach.

He was inducted into the Canadian Football Hall of Fame in 2015.

CFL coaching record

CFL GM record

Achievements
 University of Montana Athlete of the Decade (1960–1970)
 Inducted to the University of Montana Grizzly Athletic Hall of Fame in 1993
 CFL Coach of the Year (1982, 1987)
 Grey Cup champion coach (1983)
 All-time winningest coach for the Argonauts (89–79–3 in 11 seasons)

Personal
O'Billovich lives in Oakville, Ontario, married to wife Judy from Ottawa where their children, Tracy, Jodi, and Coy, were born. His younger brother, Jack "Mad Dog" O'Billovich, who died in 1995 of a heart condition, was an All-American at Oregon State who helped OSU get to the Rose Bowl in 1965.

References 

1940 births
Living people
Canadian football defensive backs
Canadian football quarterbacks
Canadian Football Hall of Fame inductees
BC Lions coaches
BC Lions general managers
Hamilton Tiger-Cats general managers
Montana Grizzlies football players
Ottawa Rough Riders players
Toronto Argonauts coaches
Toronto Argonauts general managers
Canadian Football League announcers
Sportspeople from Butte, Montana
American players of Canadian football
American people of Serbian descent
Canadian people of Serbian descent
Ottawa Gee-Gees football coaches